Pyrostria is a genus of dioecious flowering plants in the  family Rubiaceae. Most of the species are endemic to Madagascar, others occur on islands in the western Indian Ocean (Mauritius, Comoros, Réunion, Rodrigues, Socotra), a few are found in continental Africa, and only six species occur in tropical Southeast Asia. The formerly recognized genus Leroya, containing two species endemic to Madagascar, L. madagascariensis and L. richardiae, was sunk into synonymy with Pyrostria.

Species

 Pyrostria affinis (Robyns) Bridson
 Pyrostria alaotrensis Arènes ex Cavaco
 Pyrostria alluaudii Arènes ex Cavaco
 Pyrostria ambongensis (Homolle ex Arènes) Razafim. Lantz & B.Bremer
 Pyrostria ampijoroensis (Arènes) Razafim., Lantz & B.Bremer
 Pyrostria amporoforensis Cavaco
 Pyrostria analamazaotrensis Arènes ex Cavaco
 Pyrostria andilanensis Cavaco
 Pyrostria andringitrensis (Cavaco) Kainulainen & Razafim.
 Pyrostria angustifolia (A.Rich. ex DC.) Kainulainen & Razafim.
 Pyrostria anjouanensis Arènes ex Cavaco
 Pyrostria ankaranensis (Cavaco) Razafim., Lantz, B.Bremer
 Pyrostria ankazobeensis Arènes ex Cavaco
 Pyrostria antsalovensis (Cavaco) Razafim., Lantz & B.Bremer
 Pyrostria antsirananensis Razafim., Lantz & B.Bremer
 Pyrostria asosa (Arènes) Razafim., Lantz & B.Bremer
 Pyrostria bibracteata (Baker) Cavaco
 Pyrostria bispathacea (Mildbr.) Bridson
 Pyrostria breonii (Baill.) Cavaco
 Pyrostria brunnescens (Craib) Utteridge & A.P.Davis
 Pyrostria capuronii (Cavaco) Razafim., Lantz & B.Bremer
 Pyrostria chapmanii Bridson
 Pyrostria cochinchinensis (Pierre ex Pit.) Utteridge & A.P.Davis
 Pyrostria commersonii J.F.Gmel.
 Pyrostria cordifolia A.Rich. ex DC.
 Pyrostria elmeri (Merr.) Arriola, Meve & Alejandro
 Pyrostria fasciculata Bojer ex Baker
 Pyrostria ferruginea Verdc.
 Pyrostria heliconioides Mouly
 Pyrostria hystrix (Bremek.) Bridson
 Pyrostria inflata (Cavaco) A.P.Davis
 Pyrostria isomonensis (Cavaco) A.P.Davis & Govaerts
 Pyrostria italyensis (Cavaco) A.P.Davis & Govaerts
 Pyrostria ixorifolia (Homolle ex Arènes) Razafim., Lantz, B.Bremer
 Pyrostria lobulata Bridson
 Pyrostria longiflora (Cavaco) Razafim., Lantz & B.Bremer
 Pyrostria louvelii Razafim., Lantz & B.Bremer
 Pyrostria macrophylla A.Rich. ex DC.
 Pyrostria madagascariensis Lecomte
 Pyrostria major (A.Rich. ex DC.) Kainulainen & Razafim.
 Pyrostria mandrarensis (Cavaco) Kainulainen & Razafim.
 Pyrostria media (A.Rich. ex DC.) Kainulainen & Razafim.
 Pyrostria montana (Arènes) Kainulainen & Razafim.
 Pyrostria neriifolia (Homolle ex Arènes) Razafim., Lantz & B.Bremer
 Pyrostria obovatifolia  (Merr.) A.E.D.Wong, Magdaleno & Alejandro
 Pyrostria oleifolia (Homolle ex Arènes) Razafim., Lantz & B.Bremer
 Pyrostria oligophlebia  (Merr.) Pacia, Quiogue & Alejandro
 Pyrostria orbicularis A.Rich. ex DC.
 Pyrostria pendula Lantz, Klack. & Razafim.
 Pyrostria perrieri (Cavaco) Razafim., Lantz & B.Bremer
 Pyrostria phyllanthoidea (Baill.) Bridson
 Pyrostria pseudocommersonii Cavaco
 Pyrostria ramosii  (Merr.) Arriola, Parag. & Alejandro
 Pyrostria revoluta (Balf.f.) Razafim., Lantz & B.Bremer
 Pyrostria richardiae (Cavaco) Razafim., Lantz & B.Bremer
 Pyrostria sambavensis (Cavaco) Razafim., Lantz & B.Bremer
 Pyrostria sarodranensis Cavaco
 Pyrostria serpentina Lantz, Klack. & Razafim.
 Pyrostria socotrana (Radcl.-Sm.) Bridson
 Pyrostria suarezensis (Cavaco) Razafim., Lantz & B.Bremer
 Pyrostria triflora Arriola, Calaramo & Alejandro
 Pyrostria tulearensis (Cavaco) Razafim., Lantz & B.Bremer
 Pyrostria urschii Arènes ex Cavaco
 Pyrostria uzungwaensis Bridson
 Pyrostria variistipula Arènes ex Cavaco
 Pyrostria verdcourtii (Cavaco) Razafim., Lantz & B.Bremer
 Pyrostria viburnoides (Baker) Verdc.

References

External links
 World Checklist of Rubiaceae

Rubiaceae genera
Vanguerieae
Taxonomy articles created by Polbot
Dioecious plants